Hendrik ("Henk") van der Grift (born 25 December 1935) is a retired Dutch speed skater.

At the 1960 Winter Olympics van der Grift finished 10th on the 500 m and fell on the 1500 m. Not satisfied with training facilities in the Netherlands, he lived in Norway for a while, working as a car mechanic. The superior training facilities in Norway paid off and van der Grift won silver at the 1961 European Allround Championships behind Olympic Champion Viktor Kosichkin. This was the first Dutch medal in international championships in eight years and it made van der Grift one of the favourites for the World Allround Championships.

And van der Grift delivered: in what turned out to be his greatest year, he became the 1961 World Allround Champion in Gothenburg. On the 500 m during those championships, he finished second behind Soviet sprinter Yevgeny Grishin. He then lost many points on the 5000 m, but he overcame that deficit by winning the 1500 m. On the final distance (the 10000 m), he seemed to be losing his lead, surrendering one second each lap to Viktor Kosichkin. But van der Grift managed to skate his final two laps fast enough to retain his lead, narrowly edging out Kosichkin by a margin of just 0.162 points (equivalent to 3.24 seconds of difference on the 10000 m).

His victory made van der Grift the first Dutch World Allround Champion in more than 55 years – Coen de Koning had been the last in 1905. As a result of his victory, he was elected Dutch Sportsman of the year (a title shared with Judo giant Anton Geesink) and he received the 1961 Oscar Mathisen Award.

In 1962, van der Grift became Dutch Allround Champion, but he did not manage to successfully defend his World Champion title that year – after three of the four distances, van der Grift was in second place behind Boris Stenin, but despite Stenin's bad result on the final distance and van der Grift overtaking Stenin, van der Grift still finished second behind Kosichkin. The following season, he fell ill and ended his speed skating career.

Personal records

Van der Grift has a score of 175.960 points on the Adelskalendern.

Tournament overview

 NC = No classification
 DNQ = Did not qualify
source:

Medals won

Dutch records established

Note: Prior to season 1967–1968 Dutch national records would be recognized only if skated in the Netherlands

References

1935 births
Living people
Dutch male speed skaters
Olympic speed skaters of the Netherlands
People from Breukelen
Speed skaters at the 1960 Winter Olympics
World Allround Speed Skating Championships medalists
Sportspeople from Utrecht (province)